The 1993–94 Copa del Rey was the 92nd staging of the Copa del Rey.

The competition started on 15 August 1993 and concluded on 20 April 1994 with the final, held at the Vicente Calderón Stadium in Madrid.

First round

Second round

Third round

Fourth round

Fifth round

Bracket

Round of 16 

|}

First leg

Second leg

Quarter-finals 

|}

First leg

Second leg

Semi-finals 

|}

First leg

Second leg

Final

Top goalscorers

References

External links 
 www.linguasport.com 
 1993–94 Copa del Rey at BDFútbol

Copa del Rey seasons
1993–94 in Spanish football cups